The coin problem (also referred to as the Frobenius coin problem or Frobenius problem, after the mathematician Ferdinand Frobenius) is a mathematical problem that asks for the largest monetary amount that cannot be obtained using only coins of specified denominations, for example, the largest amount that cannot be obtained using only coins of 3 and 5 units is 7 units. The solution to this problem for a given set of coin denominations is called the Frobenius number of the set. The Frobenius number exists as long as the set of coin denominations has no common divisor greater than 1.

There is an explicit formula for the Frobenius number when there are only two different coin denominations,  and : the Frobenius number is then . If the number of coin denominations is three or more, no explicit formula is known. However, for any fixed number of coin denominations, there is an algorithm computing the Frobenius number in polynomial time (in the logarithms of the coin denominations forming an input). No known algorithm is polynomial time in the number of coin denominations, and the general problem, where the number of coin denominations may be as large as desired, is NP-hard.

Statement 
In mathematical terms the problem can be stated:

Given positive integers  such that gcd, find the largest integer that cannot be expressed as an integer conical combination of these numbers, i.e., as a sum: 
where  are non-negative integers.

This largest integer is called the Frobenius number of the set , and is usually denoted by 

The requirement that the greatest common divisor (GCD) equal 1 is necessary in order for the Frobenius number to exist. If the GCD were not 1, then starting at some number m the only sums possible are multiples of the GCD; every number past m that is not divisible by the GCD cannot be represented by any linear combination of numbers from the set. For example, if you had two types of coins valued at 6 cents and 14 cents, the GCD would equal 2, and there would be no way to combine any number of such coins to produce a sum which was an odd number; additionally, even numbers 2, 4, 8, 10, 16 and 22 (less than m=24) could not be formed, either.

Frobenius numbers for small n 

A closed-form solution exists for the coin problem only where n = 1 or 2. No closed-form solution is known for n > 2.

n = 1 
If n = 1, then a1 = 1 so that all natural numbers can be formed.

n = 2 
If n = 2, the Frobenius number can be found from the formula . This formula was discovered by James Joseph Sylvester in 1882, although the original source is sometimes incorrectly cited as, in which the author put his theorem as a recreational problem (and did not explicitly state the formula for the Frobenius number).
Sylvester also demonstrated for this case that there are a total of  non-representable (positive) integers.

The formula is proved as follows. Suppose we wish to construct the number .

n = 3 

Formulae and fast algorithms are known for three numbers though the calculations can be very tedious if done by hand.

Simpler lower and upper bounds for Frobenius numbers for n = 3 have been also determined. The asymptotic lower bound due to Davison

is relatively sharp. It is conjectured that a similar parametric upper bound (for values of  that are pairwise-coprime and no element is representable by the others) is  where .

Wilf's conjecture 

In 1978, Wilf conjectured that given coprime integers , and their Frobenius number , we have

where  denotes the number of all non-representable positive integers. In 2015, an asymptotic version of this was proven by Moscariello and Sammartano.

Frobenius numbers for special sets

Arithmetic sequences 
A simple formula exists for the Frobenius number of a set of integers in an arithmetic sequence. Given integers a, d, w with gcd(a, d) = 1:

 

The  case above may be expressed as a special case of this formula.

In the event that , we can omit any subset of the elements  from our arithmetic sequence and the formula for the Frobenius number remains the same.

Geometric sequences 
There also exists a closed form solution for the Frobenius number of a set in a geometric sequence. Given integers m, n, k with gcd(m, n) = 1:

 
 A simpler formula that also displays symmetry between the variables is as follows. Given positive integers , with  let . Then 
 
 where  denotes the sum of all integers in

Examples

McNugget numbers 

One special case of the coin problem is sometimes also referred to as the McNugget numbers. The McNuggets version of the coin problem was introduced by Henri Picciotto, who placed it as a puzzle in Games Magazine in 1987, and included it in his algebra textbook co-authored with Anita Wah.  Picciotto thought of the application in the 1980s while dining with his son at McDonald's, working the problem out on a napkin. A McNugget number is the total number of McDonald's Chicken McNuggets in any number of boxes. In the United Kingdom, the original boxes (prior to the introduction of the Happy Meal-sized nugget boxes) were of 6, 9, and 20 nuggets.

According to Schur's theorem, since 6, 9, and 20 are (setwise) relatively prime, any sufficiently large integer can be expressed as a (non-negative, integer) linear combination of these three.  Therefore, there exists a largest non-McNugget number, and all integers larger than it are McNugget numbers. Namely, every positive integer is a McNugget number, with the finite number of exceptions:
 1, 2, 3, 4, 5, 7, 8, 10, 11, 13, 14, 16, 17, 19, 22, 23, 25, 28, 31, 34, 37, and 43 .

Thus the largest non-McNugget number is 43. The fact that any integer larger than 43 is a McNugget number can be seen by considering the following integer partitions

Any larger integer can be obtained by adding some number of 6s to the appropriate partition above.

Furthermore, a straightforward check demonstrates that 43 McNuggets can indeed not be purchased, as:
 boxes of 6 and 9 alone cannot form 43 as these can only create multiples of 3 (with the exception of 3 itself);
 including a single box of 20 does not help, as the required remainder (23) is also not a multiple of 3; and
 more than one box of 20, complemented with boxes of size 6 or larger, obviously cannot lead to a total of 43 McNuggets.

Since the introduction of the 4-piece Happy Meal-sized nugget boxes, the largest non-McNugget number is 11. In countries where the 9-piece size is replaced with the 10-piece size, there is no largest non-McNugget number, as any odd number cannot be made.

Other examples 
In rugby union, there are four types of scores: penalty goal (3 points), drop goal (3 points), try (5 points) and converted try (7 points). By combining these any points total is possible except 1, 2, or 4. In rugby sevens, although all four types of scores are permitted, attempts at penalty goals are rare and drop goals almost unknown. This means that team scores almost always consist of multiples of try (5 points) and converted try (7 points). The following scores (in addition to 1, 2, and 4) cannot be made from multiples of 5 and 7 and so are almost never seen in sevens: 3, 6, 8, 9, 11, 13, 16, 18 and 23. By way of example, none of these scores was recorded in any game in the 2014-15 Sevens World Series.

Similarly, in American football, the only way for a team to score exactly one point is if a safety is awarded against the opposing team when they attempt to convert after a touchdown. As 2 points are awarded for safeties from regular play, and 3 points are awarded for field goals, all scores other than 1–0, 1–1, 2–1, 3–1, 4–1, 5–1 and 7–1 are possible.

Applications

Shellsort Time Complexity 
The Shellsort algorithm is a sorting algorithm whose time complexity is currently an open problem. The worst case complexity has an upper bound which can be given in terms of the Frobenius number of a given sequence of positive integers.

Least Live Weight Problem 
Petri nets are useful for modeling problems in distributed computing. For specific kinds of Petri nets, namely conservative weighted circuits, one would like to know what possible "states" or "markings" with a given weight are "live." The problem of determining the least live weight is equivalent to the Frobenius problem.

Terms in Expanded Power of a Polynomial 
When a univariate polynomial is raised to some power, one may treat the exponents of the polynomial as a set of integers. The expanded polynomial will contain powers of  greater than the Frobenius number for some exponent (when GCD=1), e.g. for  the set is {6, 7} which has a Frobenius number of 29, so a term with  will never appear for any value of  but some value of  will give terms having any power of  greater than 29.

See also 
 Postage stamp problem
 Change-making problem
 Sylver coinage
 Numerical semigroup

References

External links 
 How to order 43 Chicken McNuggets – Numberphile

Diophantine equations
Recreational mathematics